Mladen Živković (born 26 August 1989) is a Serbian football goalkeeper who plays for Železničar Pančevo.

Career
On 16 January 2019, Živković moved to Norway and joined Mjøndalen IF on a 6-month contract to replace Sosha Makani, who was injured. Only 9 days later, he left the club by mutual consent and moved back to Serbia due to personal reasons. On 30 January, he then joined FK Rad.

References

External links
 Profile at Srbijafudbal
 
 

1989 births
Living people
Sportspeople from Požarevac
Serbian footballers
Serbian expatriate footballers
Association football goalkeepers
FK Smederevo players
FK Donji Srem players
FK Sinđelić Beograd players
FK Novi Pazar players
FK Sloga Petrovac na Mlavi players
FK Radnički Niš players
PFC Chernomorets Burgas players
Mjøndalen IF players
FK Rad players
FK Mladost Lučani players
FK Mačva Šabac players
FK Napredak Kruševac players
FK Železničar Pančevo players
Serbian First League players
Serbian SuperLiga players
First Professional Football League (Bulgaria) players
Serbian expatriate sportspeople in Bulgaria
Serbian expatriate sportspeople in Norway
Expatriate footballers in Bulgaria
Expatriate footballers in Norway